The Lunar Crater Radio Telescope (LCRT) is a proposal by the NASA Institute for Advanced Concepts to create an ultra-long-wavelength (that is, wavelengths greater than 10 m, corresponding to frequencies below 30 MHz) radio telescope inside a lunar crater on the far side of the Moon.

If completed, the telescope would be 350m in diameter

History
A previous proposal put the proposed size at 1km diameter.

Notes

References

Bibliography

External links 
 Lunar Crater Radio Telescope (LCRT) on the Far-Side of the Moon - NASA NIAC Symposium 2022

Radio telescopes
Space telescopes
Proposed NASA space probes
Missions to the Moon